Liberty was a 19th-century anarchist market socialist and libertarian socialist periodical published in the United States by Benjamin Tucker from August 1881 to April 1908.

It was instrumental in developing and formalizing the American individualist anarchist market socialist philosophy, publishing essays and serving as a format for debate.

Contributors included Tucker, Lysander Spooner, Auberon Herbert, Dyer Lum, Joshua K. Ingalls, John Henry Mackay, Victor Yarros, Wordsworth Donisthorpe, James L. Walker, J. William Lloyd, Voltairine de Cleyre, Steven T. Byington, John Beverley Robinson, Jo Labadie and Henry Appleton. Its masthead featured a quote from Pierre-Joseph Proudhon, that liberty is "Not the Daughter But the Mother of Order".

Purpose 
Benjamin Tucker was an American individualist anarchist and made it clear that the purpose of the journal was to further his point of view, saying in the first issue: 

However, the journal did become a forum for argumentation about diverse views and Tucker credited both Josiah Warren and the social anarchist Proudhon as influences for Liberty. For instance, says of Proudhon the following: "Liberty is a journal brought into existence almost as a direct consequences of the teachings of Proudhon" (Liberty I). He later said that Liberty was "the foremost organ of Josiah Warren's doctrines"  (Liberty IX).

Revival 
In 1974, an attempt to revive Tucker's Liberty was undertaken by some of Laurance Labadie's associates. Edited by Earl Foley and Walter Carroll, it billed itself as "The Revival of Liberty". The first issue contained articles by Labadie, Lynne Farrow and Earl Foley. Its editorial says: "We align ourselves with the Individualist Anarchist tradition of Josiah Warren and Benjamin Tucker". However, the revival did not survive past the first issue.

In 2007, mutualist archivist Shawn P. Wilbur used microfiche obtained from Libertarian Microfiche Publishing to release the first full-text digital archive of Liberty.

See also 
 Individualist anarchism
 Individualist anarchism in the United States
 Libertarian socialism
 List of anarchist periodicals
 Lucifer the Lightbearer (1883–1907)

References

External links 
 Complete archive of Liberty and Libertas at the Libertarian Labyrinth
 Individual Liberty a collection of many of Tucker's publications from Liberty
 Comprehensive Index to Liberty
 Benjamin Tucker, Liberty, and Individualist Anarchism by Wendy McElroy
 Benjamin R Tucker & the Champions of Liberty: A Centenary Anthology edited by Michael E. Coughlin, Charles H. Hamilton and Mark A. Sullivan
 The English Individualists As They Appear In Liberty by Carl Watner
 Benjamin Tucker and His Periodical, Liberty by Carl Watner
 Liberty and Taxation by Benjamin Tucker

1881 establishments in Massachusetts
1908 disestablishments in Massachusetts
Biweekly magazines published in the United States
Anarchist periodicals published in the United States
Defunct political magazines published in the United States
Individualist anarchist publications
Magazines established in 1881
Magazines disestablished in 1908
Magazines published in Boston